Isoberlinia is a genus in the family Fabaceae of five species of tree native to the hotter parts of tropical Africa. They are an important component of miombo woodlands. The leaves have three or four pairs of large leaflets and stout seed pods.

Local Malawi names include Sukwa mutondo for Isoberlinia angolensis and Tumbuka mbwerebwere for Isoberlinia stolzii.

Some species in this genus have been transferred to the genus Julbernardia.

References

 Binns, Blodwen. (1972). Dictionary of Plant Names in Malawi. Zomba, Malawi: The Government Printer.
 Hutchinson, J. & Dalziel, J. M. (1958). Flora of West Tropical Africa, Vol. 1, Part 2. London: Crown Agents for Oversea Govts. and Admins.
 Mabberley, D. J. (1987). The Plant Book: A Portable Dictionary of the Higher Plants. Cambridge: Cambridge University Press. .

Detarioideae
Trees of Africa
Flora of South Tropical Africa
Flora of West-Central Tropical Africa
Miombo
Fabaceae genera
Taxa named by William Grant Craib
Taxa named by Otto Stapf